Leandro Nery Chaparro, better known as Leandro Chaparro (born January 7, 1991), is an Argentine footballer who plays as a midfielder for Centro Español.

Career
Born in La Tablada, Leandro Chaparro started his professional career in 2009, playing for San Lorenzo. He played a single Argentine Primera División game for the club, on September 26, 2009, when his club beat Tigre 3–2 at Estadio Coliseo de Victoria, home of the opposing team. Leandro Chaparro was transferred to Série A club Vasco da Gama of Brazil on February 15, 2011. He was signed by Vasco da Gama in February 2011, after some impressive displays for Argentina U-20.

National team
Leandro Chaparro was called up and played for the Argentina national under-18 team, and for the Argentina national under-20 team.

Career statistics
(Correct )

International statistics
As of May 30, 2011.

References

External links

1991 births
Living people
Argentine footballers
Association football midfielders
Primera Nacional players
Argentine Primera División players
Campeonato Brasileiro Série A players
Primeira Liga players
Liga Portugal 2 players
Campeonato de Portugal (league) players
San Lorenzo de Almagro footballers
Madureira Esporte Clube players
Sportivo Belgrano footballers
CR Vasco da Gama players
S.C. Beira-Mar players
G.D. Estoril Praia players
S.C. Freamunde players
Uberlândia Esporte Clube players
U.D. Oliveirense players
Centro Social y Recreativo Español players
Argentine expatriate footballers
Expatriate footballers in Brazil
Expatriate footballers in Portugal
Sportspeople from Buenos Aires Province